
Year 1528 (MDXXVIII) was a leap year starting on Wednesday (link will display the full calendar) of the Julian calendar.

Events 
 January–June 
 January 12 – Gustav I of Sweden is crowned king of Sweden, having already reigned since his election in June 1523.
 February
 Peasant uprising in Dalarna, Sweden: The rebel campaign fails, and the rebel leader, later known as Daljunkern, flees to Rostock.
 Diego García de Moguer explores the Sierra de la Plata along the Río de la Plata, and begins to travel up the Paraná River.
 Paracelsus visits Colmar in Alsace.
 April 28 – Battle of Capo d'Orso: The French fleet, under mercenary captain Filippino Doria, crushes the Spanish squadron trying to run the blockade of Naples.
 May (end) – The fourth major outbreak of the sweating sickness appears in London, rapidly spreading to the rest of England and, on this occasion, to northern Europe.

 July–December 
 September 12 – Andrea Doria defeats his former allies, the French, and establishes the independence of Genoa.
 October 3 – Álvaro de Saavedra Cerón arrives in the Maluku Islands.
 October 13 – Cardinal Thomas Wolsey founds a college in his birthplace of Ipswich, England, which becomes the modern-day Ipswich School (incorporating institutions in the town dating back to 1299).
 October 20 – The Treaty of Gorinchem is signed between Charles V, Holy Roman Emperor, and Charles, Duke of Guelders.
 November 6 – Spanish conquistador Álvar Núñez Cabeza de Vaca and his companions become the first known Europeans to set foot on the shores of what is present-day Texas.

 Date unknown 
 Montenegro gains autonomy under Ottoman power.
 Spanish Conquistador Francisco de Montejo attempts an invasion of the Yucatán, but is driven out by the Maya peoples.
 Spain takes direct control of Acapulco.
 Bubonic plague breaks out in England.
 St George's Chapel in Windsor Castle is completed.
 Chateau Fontainebleau in France is begun.
 Michelangelo Buonarroti begins work on the fortifications of Florence.
 Baldassare Castiglione publishes The Book of the Courtier.
 In Henan province, China, during the mid Ming dynasty, a vast drought deprives the region of harvests for the next two years, killing off half the people in some communities, due to starvation and cannibalism.
 Paracelsus leaves Basel.
 Perak Sultanate and Johor Sultanate were established, both states being ruled by the sons of Mahmud Shah of Malacca.

Births 

 February 29 
 Domingo Báñez, Spanish theologian (d. 1604)
 Albert V, Duke of Bavaria (d. 1579)
 March 10 – Akechi Mitsuhide, Japanese samurai and warlord (d. 1582)
 March 25 – Jakob Andreae, German theologian (d.  1590)
 June 7 – Cyriacus Spangenberg, German theologian and historian (d. 1604)
 June 21 – Maria of Austria, Holy Roman Empress (d. 1603)
 June 29 – Julius, Duke of Brunswick-Lüneburg (d. 1589)
 July 7 – Archduchess Anna of Austria, Duchess of Bavaria (d. 1590) 
 July 8 – Emmanuel Philibert, Duke of Savoy (d. 1580)
 July 26 – Diego Andrada de Payva, Portuguese theologian (d. 1575)
 August 10 – Eric II, Duke of Brunswick-Lüneburg (d. 1584)
 September 25 – Otto II, Duke of Brunswick-Harburg (d. 1603)
 October 4? – Francisco Guerrero, Spanish composer (d. 1599)
 October 10 – Adam Lonicer, German botanist (d. 1586)
 November 2 – Petrus Lotichius Secundus, German Neo-Latin poet (d. 1560)
 November 6 – Gabriel Goodman, Dean of Westminster (d. 1601)
 November 12 – Qi Jiguang, Chinese military general (d. 1588)
 November 14 – Francisco Pérez de Valenzuela, Spanish noble (d. 1599)
 November 16 – Jeanne d'Albret, Queen of Navarre (d. 1572)
 November 29 – Anthony Browne, 1st Viscount Montagu, English politician (d. 1592)
 date unknown
 Igram van Achelen, Dutch statesman (d. 1604)
 Adam von Bodenstein, Swiss alchemist and physician (d. 1577)
 Jean-Jacques Boissard, French antiquary and Latin poet (d. 1602)
 Andrey Kurbsky, Russian writer (d. 1583)
 George Talbot, 6th Earl of Shrewsbury, English statesman (d. 1590)
 Phùng Khắc Khoan, Vietnamese military strategist, politician, diplomat and poet (d. 1613)
 Sabina, Duchess of Bavaria (d. 1578)
 Tanegashima Tokitaka, Japanese daimyō (d. 1579)
 Thomas Whythorne, English musician and author (d. 1595)
 probable
 Ambrose Dudley, 3rd Earl of Warwick, English general (d. 1590)
 Paul de Foix, French diplomat (d. 1584)
 Jean de Ligne, Duke of Arenberg, stadtholder of the Dutch provinces of Friesland (d. 1568)
 Costanzo Porta, Italian composer (d. 1601)

Deaths 

 January 30 – Maharana Sangram Singh, Rana of Mewar (b. 1484)
 February 29 – Patrick Hamilton, Scottish religious reformer (martyred) (b. 1504)
 March 10 – Balthasar Hübmaier, influential German/Moravian Anabaptist leader (b. 1480)
 April 1 – Francisco de Peñalosa, Spanish composer (b. c. 1470)
 April 6 – Albrecht Dürer, German artist, writer, and mathematician (b. 1471)
 July – Palma il Vecchio, Italian painter (b. 1480)
 August 15 – Odet de Foix, Vicomte de Lautrec, French military leader (b. 1485)
 August 20 – Georg von Frundsberg, German knight and landowner (b. 1473)
 August 23 – Louis, Count of Vaudémont, Italian bishop (b. 1500)
 August 31 – Matthias Grünewald, German artist (b. 1470)
 September – Pánfilo de Narváez, Spanish conqueror and soldier in the Americas (b. 1480)
 October 5 – Richard Foxe, English churchman (b. c. 1448)
 October 18 – Michele Antonio, Marquess of Saluzzo (b. 1495)
 October 21 – Johann of Schwarzenberg, German judge and poet (b. 1463)
 November 17 – Jakob Wimpfeling, Renaissance humanist (b. 1450)
 December 7 – Margaret of Saxony, Duchess of Brunswick-Lüneburg (b. 1469)
 date unknown
 Giovanni da Verrazzano, Italian explorer (b. 1485)
 Peter Vischer the Younger, German sculptor (b. 1487)
 Mahmud Shah of Malacca, Malaccan sultan
 Daljunkern, Swedish rebel leader who may have been pretender Nils Sture (b. 1512)
 Barbro Stigsdotter, Swedish noblewoman and heroine (b. 1472)
 Guru Ravidas, (b. 1377)

References